iS-DOS is a disk operating system (DOS) for Soviet/Russian ZX Spectrum clones. iS-DOS was developed in 1990 or 1991, by Iskra Soft, in Leningrad, Soviet Union, now Saint Petersburg, Russia.

It handles floppy disks (double sided, double density), hard disk drives, and CD-ROMs. Maximum iS-DOS disk partitioning size on a hard disk is 16 MiB.

Unlike TR-DOS, iS-DOS is random-access memory (RAM) based. Such operating systems reduce the amount of memory available for user programs.

Versions 
iS-DOS Chic is a version developed for the Nemo KAY. It provides more memory for user programs.

TASiS, based on iS-DOS Chic, is a modern version developed by NedoPC for the ATM Turbo 2+ in 2006, supports the enhanced text mode and larger memory of that model.

Distributors 
 Slot Ltd. (Moscow) distributed iS-DOS in Moscow and regions in 1990s, and issued paper books.
 Nemo (Saint Petersburg) distributed iS-DOS in ex-USSR until 2004, and issued Open Letters electronic press.
 iS-DOS Support Team (Saratov Oblast) distributes iS-DOS in ex-USSR and issues iS-Files electronic press.
 NedoPC distributes TASiS as freeware.

Books 
 Картавцев И.Ю, Самыловский С.В., Криштопа С.В. "iS-DOS. Руководство пользователя". IskraSoft, Slot, С-Пб, Москва, 1993, 128 стр.
 Криштопа С.В. "Операционная система IS-DOS для ZX-SPECTRUM. Руководство программиста". "IskraSoft" С-Пб, "Slot" Москва, 1994, 84 стр.

See also 
 TR-DOS
 CP/M
 DISCiPLE
 MB02
 ESX-DOS
 DNA OS
 Kay 1024
 ATM Turbo 2+
 Scorpion ZS-256

References

External links 
 , Virtual TR-DOS
 ATM Turbo support site

Microcomputer software
Disk operating systems
ZX Spectrum
Computing in the Soviet Union
Soviet inventions